The West Indies women's national cricket team toured England in September 2012. They played against Pakistan in 1 Twenty20 International, which they won, then played against England in 5 T20Is, with the series won by England 4–1.

Squads

Tour Match: England Academy v West Indies

Only T20I: Pakistan v West Indies

WT20I Series

1st T20I

2nd T20I

3rd T20I

4th T20I

5th T20I

See also
 Pakistani women's cricket team in England in 2012

References

External links
West Indies Women tour of England 2012 from Cricinfo

West Indies women's cricket team tours
Women's cricket tours of England
International cricket competitions in 2012
2012 in women's cricket